In 2013, Transport Heritage NSW was established by the Government of New South Wales to manage the State’s rail heritage collection and provide support to the broader transport (bus, tram, rail) heritage sector in NSW following an independent review.

History
In May 2013, Minister for Transport Gladys Berejiklian acknowledged the importance of steam locomotive 3801, stating it would be a priority of Transport Heritage NSW to return it to service.

On 10 December 2013, a majority of the members of the New South Wales Rail Transport Museum voted in support of the creation of Transport Heritage NSW. Other transport heritage groups also expressed concern for their future existence. Peter Lowry was appointed as chairperson of the board and the nominated chief executive of Transport Heritage NSW, Andrew Killingsworth has been seen as a political appointment.

In February 2016, Andrew Moritz was appointed as the new chief executive following the resignation of Andrew Killingsworth. On 1 March 2017, Rob Mason, former chief executive of RailCorp was appointed as the new chairman of the board, replacing Peter Lowry.

In November 2018, plans were announced to move Transport Heritage NSW from Eveleigh Railway Workshops, in Sydney and Broadmeadow Locomotive Depot to a new location in Chullora known as the Chullora Heritage Hub.

In August 2022, former NSW Premier Nathan Rees was appointed as the new chair of the board, replacing Rob Mason. 

All locomotives formerly owned by the New South Wales Rail Transport Museum are now owned by THNSW.

Review
Major recommendations of the Rail Heritage Review included:
 consolidation the functions of several heritage entities into new body
 realise full value of the Large Erecting Shop at Eveleigh Railway Workshops, Sydney and the Broadmeadow Locomotive Depot, Newcastle

Museums
 NSW Rail Museum, Thirlmere
 Valley Heights Locomotive Depot Heritage Museum

Awards

 Winner National Trust (NSW) Heritage Awards 2016 'Events & Exhibitions' category for 2015 Transport Heritage Expo
 Winner National Trust (NSW) Heritage Awards 2022 'Events & Exhibitions' category for 2021 Locomotive 3801 Relaunch Events Program

Events
Transport Heritage NSW operates an annual program of events, including heritage train experiences across NSW.

More notable events include the Thirlmere Festival of Steam in partnership with Wollondilly Shire Council and Transport Heritage Expo.

It is also involved in the organisation of the Hunter Valley Steamfest.

Collection 
All assets previously owned by the NSW Railway Transport Museum are in the collection

Steam locomotives

Other Locomotives 

 40 class diesel locomotive 4001 (Operational, Thirlmere)
 41 class diesel locomotive 4102 (Stored, Broadmeadow)
 42 class diesel locomotive 4201 (Operational, Thirlmere)
 43 class diesel locomotive 4306 (Operational, Thirlmere)
 44 class diesel locomotives 4403 and 4490 (Operational, Thirlmere)
 442 class diesel locomotive 44211 (Stored, Thirlmere)
 45 class diesel locomotive 4501 (Operational Thirlmere), 4520 (Stored, Thirlmere)
 46 class electric  locomotive 4601 (Static Display, Valley Heights), 4638 (Stored, Broadmeadow)
 48 class diesel locomotive 4803, 4807 and 4833 (Operational, Thirlmere), 4801 and 4805 (Stored, Broadmeadow)
 49 class diesel locomotive 4916 (Operational, Thirlmere)
 71 class electric locomotive 7100 (Stored, Broadmeadow)
 73 class diesel hydraulic locomotive 7344 (Operational, Paterson), 7350 (Stored, Broadmeadow)
 86 class electric locomotive 8646 (Static Display, Thirlmere)
 X200 class diesel hydraulic locomotive X206 (Operational, Valley Heights)
 BHP Port Kembla D1 class D1 (Operational, Thirlmere)
 CPH railmotor CPH 18 (Operational, Thirlmere)
 New South Wales 620/720 class railcar 623/723 (Under Overhaul, Thirlmere)

Locomotives not owned by THNSW

 3265 (Operational, Thirlmere) - Powerhouse Museum
 3830 (Stored, Thirlmere) - Powerhouse Museum (awaiting restoration)

References

External links
 Transport Heritage NSW website

Government agencies of New South Wales
Railway museums in New South Wales
2013 establishments in Australia
Transport in New South Wales